John Joseph "Jay" Joyce is an American record producer, songwriter and session musician. In the 1990s, Joyce, with Chris Feinstein and Brad Pemberton, recorded and toured as Iodine and began working as a record producer, working with artists such as The Wallflowers, Tim Finn, Emmylou Harris, Patty Griffin, White Reaper and Cage the Elephant. In the 2000s, Joyce began producing for Eric Church, Halestorm, Zac Brown Band, Brandy Clark, Amos Lee, Declan McKenna, Fidlar and Little Big Town. 
 He has also played guitar for Crowded House, The Wallflowers, John Hiatt, Iggy Pop, Brendan Benson and Macy Gray.

In recent years the Grammy Award-Winning Producer of the Year has worked with Keith Urban, Carrie Underwood, Brothers Osborne and Miranda Lambert, as well as played a major role in helping newcomers Ashley McBryde, LANCO, Devin Dawson and Tenille Townes find unique sounds and hone their songwriting abilities. In 2014 Joyce partnered with Warner/Chappell to establish Neon Cross Music, a publishing company with a roster of rock, pop and country artists and writers.

Joyce has also received four CMA Awards and five ACM Awards including Producer of the Year. In 2018, rock critic Rob Harvilla of "The Ringer" named Joyce "the most influential—and hardest-rocking—man in Country music."

Discography

Songwriting discography

Production discography

References

American country singer-songwriters
American rock guitarists
American male guitarists
Record producers from Ohio
Record producers from Tennessee
American session musicians
Living people
Musicians from Nashville, Tennessee
Musicians from Cleveland
Businesspeople from Cleveland
Year of birth missing (living people)
Singer-songwriters from Tennessee
Singer-songwriters from Ohio
Guitarists from Tennessee
Guitarists from Ohio
Country musicians from Tennessee
Country musicians from Ohio
American male singer-songwriters